Adrenalize is the fifth studio album by English rock band Def Leppard, released on 31 March 1992 through Mercury Records. It is the first album by the band recorded without guitarist Steve Clark who died in 1991 and the only one recorded as a four-member band. Spawning seven singles, four of them – "Let's Get Rocked", "Make Love Like a Man", "Have You Ever Needed Someone So Bad", and "Stand Up (Kick Love into Motion)" – were major hits.

"White Lightning" is dedicated to the memory of Clark, who has writing credits on six of the album's 10 tracks.

Background
Def Leppard had faced long delays, and the challenge of drummer Rick Allen losing his arm while making their previous album, Hysteria, and while trying to follow up the success, they also faced the prospect of doing so with a different producer, as Robert John "Mutt" Lange was already working with Bryan Adams. At the same time guitarist Steve Clark had been suffering from alcohol addiction since 1989, spending six sessions in rehab. Clark was involved in writing six of the songs on the album, but was given an ultimatum over his alcoholism in September 1990, and put on a six-month leave of absence. Clark died four months later, in January 1991.

The band tried to continue the recording process, going back into the studio the day after Clark's death to cope with the loss, but it took several months before they were able to work to what they felt was a satisfactory standard.

Recording
Instead of replacing Clark with a new member, the band recorded the album as a four-piece. "We had recorded demos on multitrack," recalled fellow guitarist Phil Collen. "I was sitting there with him when he played the original parts. I could relay that. But it was like playing along to a ghost."

This was also the band's first album since 1981 recorded without longtime producer Robert John "Mutt" Lange. Instead, the band took matters in their own hands and produced the album themselves along with longtime engineer Mike Shipley; with Lange credited as executive producer.

"We coped without Mutt quite well…" recalled Joe Elliott. "Mutt was in his studio in Guildford with Bryan Adams and we'd be in Dublin, talking every day… But it wasn't as adventurous as Hysteria. It was more of a rock album, less experimental. It's like with Pink Floyd: to me, Adrenalize was our Wish You Were Here and Hysteria was our Dark Side of the Moon."

Commercial performance and reception
Adrenalize debuted at No. 1 on both the UK Albums Chart and, in the following week, on the U.S. Billboard 200. It stayed at No. 1 of the Billboard chart for five weeks keeping Bruce Springsteen's Human Touch off the top spot, and spent 65 weeks on the charts in total. 

The album received mixed reviews: some critics praised its production values and instantly catchy and radio-friendly material, while others called it tired and formulaic. In a four-star review for Rolling Stone, J.D. Considine wrote: "Adrenalize is so relentlessly catchy that it almost seems as if the band is about to abandon its heavy-metal roots for the greener fields of hard pop." Other reviewers also noted the album's less metal sound and pointed out its lack of cohesion. A staff writer for Sputnikmusic said that, despite the slick production, the album doesn't match the standard set by the band's previous two records, which they referred to as masterpieces." 

Writing in 2009, after Pyromania and Adrenalize have been reissued, Toby Cook of The Quietus said that, despite Adrenalize's many flaws, "the record buying public of '92 cared not." Indeed, the album would go on to sell more than seven million copies worldwide, remaining Def Leppard's last studio album to achieve major mainstream success.

Track listing

Deluxe edition (Bonus CD)

Tracks 1–4 are taken from the band's In the Clubs... In Your Face EP, recorded at Bonn, Germany, on 29 May 1992
Tracks 5 & 6 taken from "Have You Ever Needed Someone So Bad" single.
Tracks 7 & 8 taken from "Tonight" single.
Track 9 taken from "Make Love Like a Man" UK single and "Two Steps Behind" US single.
Track 10 taken from "Two Steps Behind" single.
Tracks 11 & 12 taken from "Let's Get Rocked" single.

Personnel
Joe Elliott – lead vocals, backing vocals
Phil Collen – lead and rhythm guitars (except acoustic guitar on "Tonight"), backing vocals, Cockney rhyming rap on "Make Love Like a Man"
Rick Savage – bass guitar, backing vocals, acoustic guitar on "Tonight"
Rick Allen – drums, backing vocals

Additional personnel
The Sideways Mob – backing vocals 
Robert John "Mutt" Lange, John Sykes – backing vocals
 Phil "Crash" Nicholas – keyboards on "Stand Up (Kick Love into Motion)"
Pete Woodroffe - additional guitar on "Let's Get Rocked"

Production
Mike "Bat Ears" Shipley – producer, engineer, mixing
Def Leppard – producer
Pete Woodroffe – engineer, programming, sequencing
Robert John "Mutt" Lange – executive producer
Robert Scovill – assistant engineer
Bob Ludwig – mastering
Andie Airfix – art direction
Pamela Springsteen – photography

Charts

Weekly charts

Year-end charts

Certifications

Notes

References

Def Leppard albums
1992 albums
Mercury Records albums
Vertigo Records albums
Albums produced by Mike Shipley